Beitou District is the northernmost of the twelve districts of Taipei City, Taiwan. The historical spelling of the district is Peitou. The name originates from the Ketagalan word Kipatauw, meaning witch. Beitou is the most mountainous and highest of Taipei's districts, encompassing a meadow with rivers running through the valley which have abundant steam rising from them; the result of geothermal warming.  The valley is often surrounded by mist shrouding the trees and grass. Beitou is famous for its hot springs. In March 2012, it was named one of the Top 10 Small Tourist Towns by the Tourism Bureau of Taiwan.

History
The area's hot springs had long been enjoyed by the aboriginal people of Taiwan. Shortly before the Japanese period a German sulfur merchant established the first hot spring club in Beitou.

During early Japanese rule, Hokutō was a village at the entrance of the well-known North Formosa sulfur district. The Japanese had already recognized the value of the village as a sanitary resort and constructed a Japanese inn with hot mineral baths provided by the sulfur springs. The hot springs have been developed to include aroma therapy, massage, acupuncture, hydrotherapy, and excellent cuisine which complement the entire spa experience. The mineral waters stream from the numerous geothermal vents that occur naturally in the region and are famous for their health benefits.

Between 1920 and 1941,  was governed under Shichisei District, Taihoku Prefecture. It was upgraded to a Hokutō Town in 1941.

After the handover of Taiwan from Japan to the Republic of China in 1945, it was renamed as Peitou urban township, belonging to Taipei County. Beginning in 1949, Peitou and Shilin were administered by the newly formed Yangmingshan Administrative Bureau. Both of them were merged into Taipei City on 1 July 1968 as districts. In 1974, Yangmingshan Administrative Bureau underwent restructuring and Beitou District was placed under direct jurisdiction of Taipei City.

Economy
Asus has its headquarters in Beitou.

Institutions
 National Research Institute of Chinese Medicine

Education

Universities and colleges:
 Dharma Drum Mountain Community University - Beitou Campus
 Fu Hsing Kang College
 National Defense University
 National Taipei University of Nursing and Health Science
 National Yang Ming Chiao Tung University
 Taipei City University of Science and Technology
 Taipei National University of the Arts

Junior and Senior High Schools:
 Taipei Municipal Zhong-zheng Senior High School
 Taipei Municipal Fuxing Senior High School
 Taipei Xin-Min  Junior High School
 Taipei Beitou Junior High School
 Taipei Mingde Junior High School

Infrastructure
 Beitou Refuse Incineration Plant
 Beitou-Shilin Technology Park

Tourism

Beitou has one of the largest concentrations of hot springs and spas in the world. Once a small park where locals used to relax in the hot springs, the Beitou Valley has evolved today to include over thirty resorts; a 20-minute subway ride north of Taipei takes you to Beitou.  The resorts and spas are regarded by many locals and international tourists as among the most relaxing and rejuvenating places in the country.  The spas consist of different degree pools (from cool to very hot) and minerals.
However, residents of this district note that sulfuric fumes from the hot springs do ruin their electric appliances in the long term.

Tourist attractions
 Beitou Hot Spring Museum
 Beitou Museum
 Beitou Park
 Beitou Plum Garden
 Beitou Presbyterian Church
 Grass Mountain Chateau
 Guandu Nature Park
 Guandu Temple
 Hong-Gah Museum
 Ketagalan Culture Center
 Kuandu Museum of Fine Arts
 Lady Zhou's Memorial Gate
 Nung Chan Monastery
 Taipei Public Library Beitou Branch
 Thermal Valley
 Tittot Glass Art Museum
 Yangmingshan National Park
 Zhongxing Guesthouse
 Zhuzihu Ponlai Rice Foundation Seed Field Story House
 Hot Springs in Xin Beitou and Xingyi Road
 Beitou Cape: Lighthouse and seaside resort
 Puji Temple

Transportation

The district is served by Beitou Station, Xinbeitou Station, Zhongyi Station, Qiyan Station, Fuxinggang Station, Guandu Station, Qilian Station, Mingde Station and Shipai Station of the Taipei Metro.

Notable people
 Ashin, singer, songwriter and author
 Gingle Wang, actress and writer
 Tai Chih-yuan, comedian, actor and show host

See also
 Shipai, Taipei

References

External links

 
  
 - Photos of Beitou by Junewei(Wayne)
 Ku, Melody. Travel Taiwan. Central Coast Magazine, San Luis Obispo, CA. Dec. 2004.
 https://web.archive.org/web/20120226062458/http://www.go2taiwan.net/monthly_selection.php?sqno=23

Districts of Taipei
Hot springs of Taiwan
Taiwan placenames originating from Formosan languages